Loch Mhòr is a loch in the traditional county of Inverness-shire in the Scottish Highlands. Its name literally translates to "Big Loch".

Loch Mhòr was originally two separate lochs, Loch Garth in the southwest and Loch Farraline in the northeast. The water level was raised, so it could be used as a reservoir for a hydro-electric scheme and associated aluminium smelter at Foyers. The smelter closed in 1967, but the Loch is still used as a reservoir for a 300 MW pumped-storage hydroelectricity facility. This joined the two lochs into one, though they are still divided by a causeway carrying a minor road. In its middle reaches, a broad and shallow embayment on its southeastern shore contains a scatter of islets.

The main rivers into the Loch are the River E, and some of the flow of the River Fechlin, which has been diverted through an aqueduct.

The waters of the loch empty as the River Gourag below a dam at its southwestern end. This short river joins the River Foyers which empties into Loch Ness.

References 

Mhor
Mhor
Freshwater lochs of Scotland